Nesolagus sinensis is a fossil species of striped rabbit (genus Nesolagus) from the early Middle Pleistocene "Gigantopithecus fauna" of Guangxi Zhuang Autonomous Region, China. It is believed to be ancestral to the living members of the genus, and to have evolved from the Miocene genus Alilepus. It is the first fossil taxon in its genus, and the only leporid in the Gigantopithecus fauna.

References

Prehistoric lagomorphs
Leporidae
Fossil taxa described in 2010